Sjenica is a small town and municipality located in the southwestern part of Serbia, on the vast Sjenica-Pešter plateau and geographically located in the central part of Sandžak. The population of the municipality, according to 2022 census, is 24,951.

In terms of area (1,059 km²), Sjenica is 11th largest municipality in Serbia. A multi-ethnic environment where Bosniaks, Serbs, Albanians, Montenegrins, Turks, Romani and others live in it.

According to the level of development of local self-government units for the year 2014, the municipality of Sjenica belongs to the fourth group consisting of 44 extremely underdeveloped local self-government units whose level of development is below 60% of the national average.

History
The Sjenica area was inhabited since prehistoric times. The remains of a prehistoric fortification were found on the edge of the Sjenica field, on the Zarudina hill, near Sjenica, and in several locations near Sjenica, necropolises were discovered and objects from the prehistoric period were found. In this, as well as in a wider area, lived the Dardanians, who were later driven to the south by the Illyrian tribe, Autariat.

Sjenica was first mentioned in 1253 as a place on the road to Dubrovnik, where merchants from Dubrovnik stopped and paid customs.

15th century 
In the first decades under the Ottomans (15th century), Sjenica was a vilayet and nahija of the same name as part of the Sandžak Bosna, that is, one of the hass of the Skopje-Bosnian sandžak-bey and Krajišnik Isa-bey Ishaković, son of Ishak Bey. Ottoman defteri (census books) from that period (from 1455) say that part of the Sjenica area was part of the then Branković District. 

During the reign of the Ottoman Empire, Sjenica was used as a fortified site. On a nearby hill the Ottomans built a fortress, which was later demolished. Next to the fortress was a merchants' quarter and few wooden residential homes.

18th, 19th and 20th centuries 
From 1790 to 1817, Sjenica was one of the 5 districts of the newly formed Novopazarski Sandžak: Novi Pazar, Stari Vlah (Nova Varoš), Sjenica, Mitrovica and Trgovište. In 1835, Sjenica was mentioned as the center of the Novopazarski Sandžak.

Due to its strategic, military and political importance, during the 19th century Sjenica was considered an important destination, so military and other operations were directed towards it, in which a large number of the local population died on several occasions.

After the First Balkan War, the Sjenica region became part of the Kingdom of Serbia. Sjenica became the center of the county of the same name, which had 26,381 inhabitants and included 12 municipalities, 80 villages, 44 hamlets and one borough (Sjenica). In 1917 when the area was under Austrian control a conference was held, in which the representatives drafted and signed a resolution for the union of the area with Bosnia or the establishment of an autonomous region.

From 1929 to 1941, Sjenica was part of the Zeta Banovina of the Kingdom of Yugoslavia. During World War II the SS Polizei-Selbstschutz-Regiment Sandschak under Karl von Krempler was stationed here consisted of local Muslim population, during a period when many Serbs lost their lives. In 1943 Sjenica was the battleground of intense fighting between Partisans and the German army.

Geography 
Sjenica is located at an altitude of 1,026 meters above sea level, making it one of the highest towns in Serbia and the Balkans. Temperatures fall below freezing on average 134 days per year, with the first freeze in late September and the last in early May. 

According to the Köppen-Geiger climate classification, it has a humid continental climate (Dfb) with freezing and not so humid winters, and with warm and humid summers, but with cold nights. The town itself extends on the right side of the Uvac river and is located along the Grabovica river, in the spacious Sjenica basin, at an altitude of 1,000-1,030 m above sea level.

In terms of area (1,059 km²), Sjenica is one of the largest municipalities in Serbia. The Sjenički region is located in the mountainous surroundings of Golija (1,833 m), Jadovnik (1,733 m), Ozren (1,693 m), Zlatar (1,625 m), Giljeva (1,617 m), Žilindar (1,616 m), Javor (1,519 m), Ninaja (1,362 m), Jaruta (1,428 m) and other mountain ranges, on the one hand, and the spacious valleys of Sjenica, Pešter (Ugljan), Koštan and other fields.

It borders the municipalities of Bijelo Polje (Montenegro), Prijepolje, Tutin, Novi Pazar, Ivanjica and Nova Varoš. The area of the Sjenica-Pešter Plateau abounds in extremely large natural potentials, suitable especially for the development of agriculture and animal husbandry, as well as significant mineral wealth (large deposits of brown - lignite coal).

Exceptional natural amenities and a developed tradition of winter sports make the area of the municipality of Sjenica one of the greatest potentials for the development of winter sports, as well as summer recreational and excursion tourism, in the territory of the Republic of Serbia and beyond. In this sense, Sjenica has a large number of ski slopes, as well as the National Biathlon Center Žari.

Of the other potentials, the Uvac, Gutavica and Paljevine nature reserves, Sjenica lake, the large Peštersko polje, the Uša cave system, Tubića cave, Baždarska cave, meanders of the Vapa river, as well as numerous archaeological sites and localities stand out.

Climate 
In addition to its other specifics, Sjenica is known in Europe as one of the coldest inhabited places. Winters in Sjenica are long and cold, and low temperatures can sometimes last for days (in January 2005, the unofficial lowest temperature in Serbia was recorded in Sjenica, −42°C). 

Officially, the lowest measured temperature in Sjenica municipality, −39°C, was recorded on January 26, 2006, in Krajukića Bunari. In Sjenica town, on January 26, 1954, −38.4°C was measured.

Settlements 
Aside from the town of Sjenica, the municipality includes the following settlements:

 Aliveroviće
 Bagačiće
 Bare
 Bačija
 Bioc
 Blato
 Boguti
 Božov Potok
 Boljare
 Borišiće
 Boroviće
 Breza
 Brnjica
 Buđevo
 Vapa
 Veskoviće
 Visočka
 Višnjeva
 Višnjice
 Vrapci

 Vrbnica
 Vrsjenice
 Goluban
 Gornje Lopiže
 Goševo
 Grabovica
 Gradac
 Grgaje
 Doliće
 Donje Goračiće
 Donje Lopiže
 Dragojloviće
 Draževiće
 Družiniće
 Dubnica
 Duga Poljana
 Dujke
 Dunišiće
 Žabren
 Žitniće

 Zabrđe
 Zaječiće
 Zahumsko
 Jevik
 Jezero
 Kalipolje
 Kamešnica
 Kanjevina
 Karajukića Bunari
 Kijevci
 Kladnica
 Kneževac
 Koznik
 Kokošiće
 Krajinoviće
 Krivaja
 Krnja Jela
 Krstac
 Krće
 Lijeva Reka

 Ljutaje
 Mašoviće
 Medare
 Međugor
 Milići
 Papiće
 Petrovo Polje
 Plana
 Poda
 Ponorac
 Pralja
 Raždaginja
 Rasno
 Raspoganče
 Rastenoviće
 Raškoviće
 Skradnik
 Strajiniće
 Stup
 Sugubine

 Sušica
 Trešnjevica
 Trijebine
 Tuzinje
 Tutiće
 Uvac
 Ugao
 Ursule
 Ušak
 Fijulj
 Caričina
 Cetanoviće
 Crvsko
 Crčevo
 Čedovo
 Čipalje
 Čitluk
 Šare
 Štavalj
 Šušure

Demography 

According to the last official census of 2022, the Municipality of Sjenica has a population of 24,951 inhabitants. The population density on the territory of the municipality is 23.5 inhabitants per square kilometer.

Ethnic groups
In 1991, the population of the municipality of Sjenica was 76.1% ethnic Muslims, 22.6% Serbs and Montenegrins, and 1.3% others. In the 1991 census, most of those who declared themselves as ethnic Muslims, some declared themselves as Bosniaks in the next census of 2002, while others still declared themselves as a Muslims by ethnicity.

Most of the population in Sjenica are Bosniaks or Muslims by the ethnicity (78.55%), followed by Serbs (19.95%) and Romani (0.35%). Ethnic composition of the municipality (2011 census):

Economy
The following table gives a preview of total number of registered people employed in legal entities per their core activity (as of 2018):

Governance 
The Sjenica Municipal Assembly is the highest legislative body. As a representative body, it has exclusively political functions, adopts the municipal statute, decisions and other municipal regulations, approves the budget, budget rebalancing (if necessary) and the final budget account, development and other plans and programs, supervises the work of the head of the Municipal Administration and the administrative service, elects the assembly leadership (president, deputy president and secretary of the assembly), adopts the rules of procedure on its work, the Decision on the symbols of the municipality and performs other tasks determined by the law and the statute of the municipality.

The municipal assembly consists of councilors who are elected for a period of four years, in accordance with election regulations. In accordance with its territorial organization, the number of local communities and the number of inhabitants, the Sjenica Municipal Assembly has 39 councilors.

Education 
The educational system in the municipality of Sjenica covers pre-school, elementary and secondary education. The network of educational institutions in the municipality consists of one preschool institution, eight elementary schools and two secondary schools. In recent years, approximately 4,000 students attend elementary schools on average, while just under 1,000 students attend high school and technical-agricultural school.

Preschool 
The preschool education system in the municipality of Sjenica consists of one public preschool institution, "Maslačak". The founder of the institution is the municipality of Sjenica. The institution has one building with a total usable area of 852 m², which includes five (5) work rooms and one (1) hall. Another facility is under construction, with a projected area of 1,826 m², with 6 work rooms and several halls.

Elementary 
The elementary education system in Sjenica consists of 8 parent schools with a total of 27 separate schools. With the total of 3,043 students, there are 2 elementary schools in the town area:

 Elementary school "12. December" (elementary school in Sjenica and 4 regional schools - Bagačiće, Dunišiće, Fijulje and Vapa),
 Elementary school "Svetozar Marković" (elementary school in Sjenica and 3 district schools - Gonje, Trijebine and Lopiže).

The following elementary schools operate in the rural area:

 Elementary school "Bratstvo-jedinstvo" with headquarters (parent school) in Duga Poljana and regional schools in Žabren, Dražević, Kamešnica, Šare and Žitnić.
 Elementary school "Rifat Burdžović - Tršo" with headquarters (parent school) in Karajukića Bunari and regional schools in Rasno, Budjevo, Ugl, Dolić, Tuzinje and Cetanovići.
 Elementary school "Jovan Jovanović Zmaj" with headquarters (parent school) in Raždaginja (village Zaječiće) and district schools in Kijevci and Dujke.
 Elementary school "Vuk Karadžić" with headquarters (parent school) in Kladnica, one facility for pre-school education and regional schools in Ursula and Sugubine.
 Elementary school "Branko Radičević" with headquarters (home school) in Štavlje and regional schools in Stup, Dragojlovići and Brnjica.
 Elementary school "Sveti Sava" with headquarters (parent school) in Bari and regional schools in Vrbnica and Crvsko.

Secondary 
The secondary education system in the municipality of Sjenica consists of two secondary schools: the gymnasium "Jezdimir Lović", and Technical and Agricultural School. The "Jezdimir Lović" gymnasium, based in Sjenica, started its work in 1961 as an advanced department of the gymnasium from Novi Pazar, and in 1962 it became an independent educational institution. The technical agricultural school with headquarters in Sjenica was founded in 1922 as a vocational school. Today, it trains personnel for various occupations in the fields of technical and agricultural professions.

International relations

Twin cities 
  Nakskov, Denmark
  Kartal, Turkey

Gallery

See also
 Bosniaks of Serbia
 Sandžak
 Sjenica Airport

Notes
1.Ski center Žari is national Biathlon center with 5.5km long trails for Nordic sports with shooting range and 850m long trail for Alpine skiing.

References

External links

 OFFICIAL PRESENTATION OF THE MUNICIPALITY OF SJENICA

 
Populated places in Zlatibor District
Sandžak
Municipalities and cities of Šumadija and Western Serbia